Barbetta is an Italian restaurant focused on Piemonte cuisine located at 321 West 46th Street (between 8th Avenue and 9th Avenue) on the Theater District's Restaurant Row in New York City. Founded in 1906, Barbetta is one of the city's oldest family-owned Italian restaurants and the oldest restaurant in the Theater District. It holds many other firsts from its food innovations.

Barbetta was founded in 1906 by Sebastiano Maioglio and is now owned by his daughter, Laura Maioglio, who took over in 1962.

Innovations
Barbetta was the first Italian restaurant to present white truffles "on a continuous and regular basis during the truffle season" and was one of the first restaurants in Manhattan to add a garden for dining outdoors.

Recognition
Barbetta is the first restaurant in America to have received landmark status from the Locali Storici d'Italia when it was designated Locale Storico (Historic Establishment).

In 2013, Zagat gave it a food rating of 22.

References

External links

Restaurants in Manhattan
Italian-American culture in New York City
Italian restaurants in New York City
Restaurants established in 1906
Theater District, Manhattan
1906 establishments in New York City